Something Like Silas was an American Christian alternative rock band from San Diego, California.

Background 

The band played at the Hume Lake Christian camp before being signed onto Sparrow Records in 2003. They were also the regular band at Flood, a ministry that met at Kearny High School in San Diego, and was pastored by Matt Hammett. In late 2006, the band members regrouped, with a different musical direction, as Future of Forestry.

Members 
 Final
 Eric Owyoung - lead vocal, guitar, keys
 Nick Maybury - guitar, vocals, keys
 Luke Floeter - bass, keys
 Spencer Kim - drums

 Former members
 Ben Wurzell - bass
 John Luzzi - bass
 Malina Owyoung - keyboards, vocals
 Lenny Beh - drums

Discography

Albums 
 Creation's Call - Independent (2000)
 Something Like Silas Live - Independent (2001)
 SL Silas EP - Independent (2002)
 Glimpses - Independent (2003)
 Divine Invitation - Sparrow Records (2004)

Singles 
 "Prayer for Santana" - Independent (2001)

External links

References

Christian rock groups from California
Alternative rock groups from California
Musical groups from San Diego